Frank Noel Wilkes  (16 June 1922 – 20 August 2015) was an Australian politician who served as the Leader of the Labor Opposition in Victoria from 1977 to 1981.

Early life
Wilkes was born in Melbourne and educated at Northcote Primary and Secondary Schools and Preston Technical College. During the Second World War he served in the southwest Pacific in the Australian Army as a radio operator. After the war he studied accountancy, and worked in his father's furniture factory, of which he later became manager. In 1954 he was elected to Northcote City Council, which he almost completely dominated. Wilkes served as a Councillor until 1978, but he never became Mayor, as work commitments being both a councillor and a parliamentarian were too great.

Political career
The state electorate of Northcote had been held since 1917 by John Cain Sr., leader of the Labor Party and three times Premier of Victoria. Wilkes became a protégé of Cain's and joined the Labor Party in 1948, despite his family background in business. He was Cain's campaign manager at the 1952 and 1955 state elections. Upon Cain's sudden death in 1957, Wilkes was elected to the Victorian Legislative Assembly at the subsequent by-election. He became Labor Whip in 1959, and Deputy Leader in 1967.

Wilkes was a loyal deputy to Clyde Holding, who led the ALP in opposition from 1967 to 1977 and lost three elections to the Liberal Party, first to Henry Bolte and then to Sir Rupert Hamer. When Holding resigned after the ALP's landslide defeat in 1976, Wilkes claimed the leadership by right of long and loyal service, rather than any outstanding ability. He was an uninspiring speaker and no match for the urbane Hamer in Parliament or on the hustings. Wilkes and Holding, who were both informers for the United States, told diplomatic officials in 1974 of a "renovation" or "coup" they were staging within the Victorian Young Labor organisation to remove "pro-Arab" supporters.

Nevertheless, at the 1979 state election, Labor under Wilkes gained eleven seats, the party's best showing for 24 years.  The ALP even won constituencies in eastern Melbourne, a region from which it had been shut out for a quarter-century. However, due to the uneven nature of the swing, Labor came up nine seats short of making Wilkes premier.

While Wilkes had brought Labor within striking distance of victory at the next election, few within the party thought that he could take the party further. John Cain Jr., son of the former Premier and a man whom most believed to be of greater ability than Wilkes, had been elected to Parliament in 1976 and by 1979 was among the leading ALP parliamentarians. During 1980 and 1981 Cain's supporters (such as Bill Landeryou) destabilized Wilkes's leadership and eventually forced his resignation.

When Cain led Labor to victory in 1982, Wilkes was made Minister for Local Government. He retired in 1988 from Parliament after more than 30 years of service. In the 1989 Queen's Birthday honours, he was made a Member of the Order of Australia for service to government and politics and to the Victorian parliament.

Personal life
Wilkes' daughter Helen Buckingham was a Labor member of the Victorian Legislative Council from 2002 to 2006. Wilkes died on 20 August 2015, aged 93.

References

1922 births
2015 deaths
Australian Labor Party members of the Parliament of Victoria
Members of the Victorian Legislative Assembly
Members of the Order of Australia
Recipients of the Centenary Medal
Leaders of the Opposition in Victoria (Australia)
Politicians from Melbourne
Australian Army soldiers
Australian Army personnel of World War II